Clash on Broadway is a box set compilation album by the English punk rock band the Clash, released on Legacy Records in 1991. It comprises 64 tracks on three compact discs, spanning the time period from their 1977 debut single, "White Riot", through the Combat Rock album of 1982. It does not include material from the band's final sessions led by Joe Strummer and Paul Simonon, resulting in the final album Cut the Crap (1985). It was initially released in longbox form.

Content
The set contains five previously unreleased tracks, two early demo recordings, and three live recordings, one of which had been released on a film soundtrack. Thirteen of the eighteen singles released during the time frame covered appear, leaving out "Remote Control", released as a single against the band's wishes, "English Civil War" and "I Fought the Law", both of which appear via live versions, as well as "Hitsville UK" and "Know Your Rights".

Disc one contains mostly recordings taken from the band's early singles, including the extended play single Capital Radio (1977), and their 1977 debut album. The four songs deleted from the British version of The Clash album and replaced by singles tracks for the American version—"Deny", "Protex Blue", "Cheat" and "48 Hours"—are included. Disc two focuses on tracks from the albums Give 'Em Enough Rope (1978) and London Calling (1979), and the extended play single The Cost of Living (1979). Disc three contains tracks from Sandinista! (1980) and Combat Rock (1982), with tracks from the latter including both edited and unedited versions.

Track listing

Personnel
The Clash
Mick Jones – vocals, guitars, keyboards
Joe Strummer – vocals, guitars, keyboards
Paul Simonon – bass guitar, vocals
Terry Chimes – drums (on disc one, tracks 1–15)
Topper Headon – drums, piano, bass, vocals (on disc one, tracks 16–25, and discs two and three)

Technical
Richard Bauer – compilation producer
Don DeVito – compilation producer
Kosmo Vinyl – project director, liner notes
Ray Staff – remastering
Bob Whitney – remastering
Bill Price – remastering supervisor
Hugh Attwool – tape research
Bruce Dickinson – tape research
Josh Cheuse – art direction, cover design
Lester Bangs – liner notes 
Mickey Gallagher – liner notes 
Lenny Kaye – liner notes 
Keith Levene – liner notes 
Bernard Rhodes – liner notes

References

1991 compilation albums
Albums produced by Bill Price (record producer)
The Clash compilation albums
Epic Records compilation albums